The King of Elfland's Daughter is a 1977 concept album by former Steeleye Span members Bob Johnson and Peter Knight. It was based on the 1924 fantasy novel of the same name by Lord Dunsany.  The cover illustration is by Jimmy Cauty.

Track listing 

Side 1
"The Request" (3.23) vocals - Chris Farlowe
"Lirazel" (4.11) vocals - Mary Hopkin
"Witch" (3.35) vocals - P.P. Arnold
"Alveric's Journey Through Elfland" (4.57) vocals - Frankie Miller

Side 2
"The Rune of the Elf King" (3.59) vocals - Christopher Lee
"The Coming of the Troll" (1.53) vocals - Alexis Korner
"Just Another Day of Searching" (5.09) vocals - Frankie Miller
"Too Much Magic" (3.58) vocals - Derek Brimstone
"Beyond the Fields We Know" (4.29) vocals - Mary Hopkin

Personnel

Musicians 
Bob Johnson: acoustic and electric guitars; bass guitar (#1,3)
Peter Knight: autoharp, synthesiser, electric piano, glockenspiel, piano, violins, mandolins 
Herbie Flowers: bass guitar (#2-9)
Nigel Pegrum: drums, percussion (#1-6)
Ray Cooper: percussion (#2,4)
Chris Spedding: acoustic guitars (#9)
Kenny Clarc: drums (#7,9)
Tony Newman: drums (#8) 
Mike Bait: clarinet (#6)
The Maggins String Quartet: strings quartet (#7)

Cast 
Aside from the musicians on the album, also featured was a cast of actors and musicians who played the parts of the characters in the book:
The King of Elfland and the narrator: Christopher Lee
Lirazel: Mary Hopkin 
Alveric: Frankie Miller 
The Troll: Alexis Korner 
The Witch: P.P. Arnold 
A villager of Erl: Chris Farlowe 
A Villager of Erl: Derek Brimstone
Children of Erl: Gayhurst Junior School Choir
The English Chorale : Choir
Barry St. John 
Liza Strike 
Vicki Brown 
Bob Johnson 
Lavinia Rodgers 
Denise Garcia 
Eleanor Keenan

The cast provided all the vocals for the album; neither Johnson nor Knight contributed any vocals.

Orchestrated and conducted by Peter Knight, except for "The Rune of the Elf King" which was orchestrated by Paul Lewis.

References 

1977 albums
Concept albums
Music based on novels
Chrysalis Records albums
Adaptations of works by Lord Dunsany